Qebleh Ei Pain (also Romanized as Qebleh Eī Pā’īn, Qebleh’ī-ye Pā’īn, and Qeblehī-ye Pā’īn) is a village in Jahangiri Rural District, in the Central District of Masjed Soleyman County, Khuzestan Province, Iran. At the 2006 census, its population was 93, in 13 families.

References 

Populated places in Masjed Soleyman County